Galium parishii (Parish's bedstraw) is a species of plants in the family Rubiaceae. It is native to southern California (Inyo, San Bernardino, Riverside, Los Angeles and San Diego Counties) and southern Nevada (Clark, Nye and Lincoln Counties).

References

External links
Gardening Europe

parishii
Flora of Nevada
Flora of California
Plants described in 1818
Flora without expected TNC conservation status